Hamam (also known as Steam: The Turkish Bath) is a 1997 Italian-Turkish-Spanish film directed by Ferzan Özpetek about the powerful transformations certain places can cause in people.

Synopsis 
Francesco (Alessandro Gassman) and Marta (Francesca d'Aloja) are an uptight Italian couple running a small design firm. Their marriage, once the most important thing to both, has lost all meaning. Francesco loses interest in Marta, prompting her to start an affair with their business partner.

Francesco's aunt Anita, the black sheep of the family, dies in Istanbul, where Francesco goes to try to sell the property he has inherited as quickly as possible.

The family who had managed the property under Anita's supervision and direction welcomes him with hospitality, but they are concerned about what the future holds for them. Their young son Mehmet (Mehmet Günsür) is particularly eager to show their handsome guest around.

When Francesco discovers the property includes a derelict hamam, a Turkish bath, he instead decides to restore the hamam and reopen it to the public. During the restoration, he starts a relationship with Mehmet.

Meanwhile, Marta arrives in Istanbul to get a speedy divorce from Francesco, but she is taken aback when she realizes how much Francesco has changed from his old self: both the hamam and Mehmet's unconditional affection were just what he needed, giving him back a purpose in life. Marta falls in love with him again, causing Rome and the divorce to lose importance for her.

Francesco's unwillingness to sell the property makes him enemies, some of whom ultimately murder him.

Marta decides to stay in Istanbul and run the hamam, the final scene suggesting she has turned into a second Anita.

Cast
 Alessandro Gassman as Francesco
 Francesca d'Aloja as Marta
 Carlo Cecchi as Oscar
 Halil Ergün as Osman
 Serif Sezer as Perran
 Mehmet Günsür as Mehmet
 Basak Köklükaya as Fusun
 Alberto Molinari as Paolo
 Zozo Toledo as Zozo
 Ludovica Modugno as Voice of Aunt Anita (voice)

Other cast members; Zerrin Arbas, Necdet Mahfi Ayral, Murat Ilker and Alper Kul

References

External links 
 

1997 drama films
1997 LGBT-related films
1997 films
Films directed by Ferzan Özpetek
Films set in Istanbul
Films shot in Turkey
Golden Orange Award for Best Film winners
Italian LGBT-related films
Spanish LGBT-related films
Turkish LGBT-related films
LGBT-related drama films
1997 multilingual films
Spanish multilingual films
Turkish multilingual films
Italian multilingual films
1990s Italian-language films
1990s Turkish-language films